Ahmed Attaf (Arabic: أحمد عطاف), born July 10, 1953 in Ain Defla, Algeria, is an Algerian politician and diplomat.

He is the current Minister of Foreign Affairs and the National Community Abroad since March 18, 2023, after having held the position from early 1996 to late 1999.

Biography 
He was born in Ain Defla, Algeria.

He is a member of the National Rally for Democracy.

He graduated from the Ecole Nationale d'Administration in Algiers in 1972 and has served as Algerian Ambassador to India, to Yugoslavia and to the United Kingdom.

He was Minister-Delegate to the Foreign Minister in charge of Maghreb and African Affairs and then served as Foreign Minister from January 1996 until 1999.

References

1953 births
Living people
Algerian diplomats
Ambassadors of Algeria to India
Ambassadors of Algeria to Yugoslavia
Ambassadors of Algeria to the United Kingdom
Democratic National Rally politicians
Government ministers of Algeria
Algerian expatriates in the United Kingdom
Foreign ministers of Algeria
People from Aïn Defla
21st-century Algerian people